Platystomatichthys sturio is the only species in the genus Platystomatichthys of the catfish (order Siluriformes) family Pimelodidae. It is sometimes called the sturgeon catfish. This species occurs in the Amazon Basin and reaches a length of about  TL. Platystomatichthys is classified under the "Calophysus-Pimelodus clade". Within this clade, it is considered a part of the "Pimelodus-group" of Pimelodids, which also includes Pimelodus, Exallodontus, Duopalatinus, Cheirocerus, Iheringichthys, Bergiaria, Bagropsis, Parapimelodus, Platysilurus, and Propimelodus.

References

Pimelodidae
Fish of South America
Fish of Brazil
Fish of Ecuador
Fish of Peru
Fish of Venezuela
Fish of the Amazon basin
Taxa named by Pieter Bleeker
Monotypic ray-finned fish genera